Fissicrambus orion is a moth in the family Crambidae. It was described by Stanisław Błeszyński in 1963. It is found in French Guiana and Colombia.

References

Crambini
Moths described in 1963
Moths of South America